The Honourable John James Garden Ramsay (1827 – 20 January 1890) was an industrialist and politician in colonial South Australia.

Ramsay was born in Edinburgh, Scotland, and served his apprenticeship as an engineer at the St. Rollox Ironworks in Glasgow, and came to South Australia in 1857, establishing four years later at Mount Barker an agricultural implement and machine manufactory, which represented the starting point of what later grew into the largest business of its kind in the colony.

Ramsay represented Mount Barker in the South Australian Legislative Assembly from 5 April 1870 (along with John Cheriton), and on 7 July 1880 was elected to the South Australian Legislative Council, for which he sat until of his death. Ramsay was Commissioner of Public Works in the Henry Ayers Ministry from January to March 1872 and in the two John Cox Bray governments from June 1881 to June 1884. Ramsay was Chief Secretary under John Cox Bray from 23 April 1884 to 16 June 1884; and under Thomas Playford II from 11 June 1887 to 27 June 1889.

In 1886 Ramsay received the Queen's permission to bear the style of The Honourable within the colony.
On 20 January 1890, Ramsay died from injuries sustained when an oil lamp in a railway carriage in which he was travelling burst, showering him with burning kerosene.

Family
James Garden Ramsay married Mary Elliot Robertson ( – 4 May 1876) in 1854.
He married again, to Bertha Ellen Horwood (20 December 1854 – 22 November 1942) on 6 December 1883. Bertha was a daughter of Bendigo (originally Adelaide) industrialist Joel Horwood, jnr, (1832–1900).

References

|-

|-

|-

|-

|-

|-

1827 births
1890 deaths
Members of the South Australian Legislative Council
Members of the South Australian House of Assembly
Scottish emigrants to Australia
Politicians from Edinburgh
Australian mechanical engineers
Australian ironmasters
19th-century Australian politicians